Gordon Falcon is a New Zealand rugby league footballer who played rugby league professionally for the Penrith Panthers and rugby union for the New Zealand Māori and Hawke's Bay.

References

1970 births
Living people
Māori All Blacks players
New Zealand Māori rugby league players
New Zealand rugby league players
New Zealand rugby union players
Penrith Panthers players
Rugby league players from Gisborne, New Zealand
Rugby league props
Rugby league second-rows
Rugby union flankers
Rugby union players from Gisborne, New Zealand